The Illinois–Indiana State Line Boundary Marker is a sandstone boundary marker obelisk located near the end of Chicago's Avenue G, just west of the State Line Generating Plant of Hammond, Indiana.

The obelisk was constructed by the Office of the United States Surveyor General ca. 1838. As one of the earliest structures still standing in Chicago, the marker earned Chicago Landmark status on September 4, 2002.

References

1838 in the United States
1838 sculptures
Borders of Illinois
Borders of Indiana
Hammond, Indiana
Chicago Landmarks
Historic surveying landmarks in the United States
Obelisks in the United States
Monuments and memorials in Illinois
Buildings and structures in Lake County, Indiana
Monuments and memorials in Indiana